Irvington Public Schools is a public school district serving children in pre-kindergarten through twelfth grade in Irvington, New Jersey, United States. The district is one of 31 former Abbott districts statewide that were established pursuant to the decision by the New Jersey Supreme Court in Abbott v. Burke which are now referred to as "SDA Districts" based on the requirement for the state to cover all costs for school building and renovation projects in these districts under the supervision of the New Jersey Schools Development Authority.

As of the 2019–20 school year, the district, comprised of 12 schools, had an enrollment of 8,020 students and 530.0 classroom teachers (on an FTE basis), for a student–teacher ratio of 15.1:1.

The district is classified by the New Jersey Department of Education as being in District Factor Group "A", the lowest of eight groupings. District Factor Groups organize districts statewide to allow comparison by common socioeconomic characteristics of the local districts. From lowest socioeconomic status to highest, the categories are A, B, CD, DE, FG, GH, I and J.

Schools
Schools in the district (with 2019–20 enrollment data from the National Center for Education Statistics) are:
Preschool
Augusta Preschool Academy (with 341 students; in PreK)
Hubert Ato-Bakari Chase
Elementary schools
Berkeley Terrace School (387; PreK–5)
Sean Evans, Principal
Chancellor Avenue School (527; K–5)
Andrea Tucker, Principal
Florence Avenue School (672; K–5)
Frantz Meronvil, Principal
Grove Street School (428; PreK–5)
Dr. Deniese Cooper, Principal
Madison Avenue School (410; PreK–5)
Rose Gordon, Principal
Thurgood G. Marshall School (398; PreK–5)
Stacey Love, Principal
Mount Vernon Avenue School (542; K–5)
Kcyied Zahir, Principal
University Elementary School (403; K–5)
Dr. Chinaire Simons, Principal
Middle schools
Union Avenue Middle School (778; 6–8)
Muller Pierre, Principal
University Middle School (403; 6–8)
Michael Bussacco, Principal
High school
Irvington High School (1,558; 9–12)
Malikita Wright, Principal
Rita L. Owens STEAM Academy (9-12)
Tyisha Bennett, Principal

Administration
Core members of the district's administration are:
Dr. April Vauss, Superintendent
Reginald Lamptey, Business Administrator / Board Secretary

Board of education
The district's board of education, comprised of nine members, sets policy and oversees the fiscal and educational operation of the district through its administration. As a Type II school district, the board's trustees are elected directly by voters to serve three-year terms of office on a staggered basis, with three seats up for election each year held as part of the April school election. The board appoints a superintendent to oversee the district's day-to-day operations and a business administrator to supervise the business functions of the district. As one of the 13 districts statewide with school elections in April, voters also decide on passage of the annual school budget.

References

External links
Irvington Public Schools

School Data for the Irvington Public Schools, National Center for Education Statistics

New Jersey Abbott Districts
New Jersey District Factor Group A
School districts in Essex County, New Jersey
Irvington, New Jersey